A C mount is a type of lens mount commonly found on 16 mm movie cameras, closed-circuit television cameras, machine vision cameras and microscope phototubes.

C-mount lenses provide a male thread, which mates with a female thread on the camera. The thread is nominally  in diameter, with 32 threads per inch (0.794 mm pitch), designated as "1-32 UN 2A" in the ANSI B1.1 standard for unified screw threads.

Merely to say that a lens is "C-mount" says very little about the lens's intended use. C-mount lenses have been made for many different formats. C-mount lenses are built for the 8 mm and 16 mm film formats and the 1/3", 1/2", 2/3", 1", and 4/3" video formats, which corresponds to a range of image circles approximately from 5 to 22 mm in diameter.

Depending on the format, the design of the lens and its performance will differ considerably. For example, for the 4/3 format, a 12 mm lens is a wide-angle lens and will have a retrofocus design. For the 2/3-inch format, a 12 mm lens is "normal" and can have a simple and fast double Gauss layout. For the 1/3-inch format, a 12 mm lens is long and can have a telephoto design.

Some TV lenses lack provision to focus or vary the aperture, so may not operate properly with film cameras. Also, some TV lenses may have bits that protrude behind the mount far enough to interfere with the shutter or reflex finder mechanisms of a film camera.

Although C-mount lenses have a back focal distance far too short to be used with 35 mm film SLRs or any existing digital SLR (except some mirrorless cameras, e.g. Canon EOS M), they can be mounted on interchangeable-lens mirrorless digital cameras such as the Micro Four Thirds used by Olympus and Panasonic. However, the vast majority of C-mount lenses produce an image circle too small to effectively cover the entire sensor which has approximately 22 mm diagonal, this produces vignetting. The Nikon 1 series and the Pentax Q series can use C-mount lenses without vignetting.

C mount was created by Bell & Howell for their Filmo 70 cine cameras.  The earliest Filmos had slightly different mounts, known as A mount, and B mount.  C mount was found on Filmo 70 cameras with serial numbers 54090 and higher, probably from about 1926.  Soon after, other camera manufacturers adopted the same mount, and it became a de facto standard for 16 mm cine cameras.

CS mount 
CS-mount lenses are built for the smaller formats, 1/2 inch and down.

See also
 T-mount
 Lens mount
 Pentax K-mount
 D-mount
 PL-mount
 S-mount

References
ISO 10935:1996, "Optics and optical instruments -- Microscopes -- Interfacing connection type C"

External links
Making Digital Camera Microscope Adapters.  The section "Understanding C-Mount and CS-Mount Standard Mechanics, Optics, and Cameras" discusses the standards and custom machining of C-mount apparatus.
List of some C-mount lenses.  Collection of cine optics and photos of them.
Machine Vision Inspection Technology. Selection of Lens and extension ring/tube for machine vision
C-Mount explained. Explanation of C-mount and CS-mount

Lens mounts
Film and video technology